Rasce may refer to:
 Rašće, Bosnia and Herzegovina
 Rašče, North Macedonia